Vladyslav Fedorovych Shapoval (born 8 May 1995) is a Ukrainian professional footballer who plays as a defender for Polissya Zhytomyr.

Career

Yunist Chernihiv
Shapoval attended the Sportive youth school of FC Yunist Chernihiv in his native city of Chernihiv.

Volyn Lutsk
He made his debut for FC Volyn Lutsk played as substituted in the game against FC Shakhtar Donetsk on 21 November 2015 in the Ukrainian Premier League.

Dnipro-1
In 2018 he moved to Dnipro-1 for two season where he won the Ukrainian First League in the season 2018–19.

Ahrobiznes Volochysk
On 19 April 2021 he scored his first goal with the new club against Krystal Kherson in Ukrainian First League. On 25 April 2021 he scored against Obolon Kyiv in Ukrainian First League in 2020-21 giving the victory for Ahrobiznes Volochysk.

Polissya Zhytomyr
In summer 2021 he moved to Polissya Zhytomyr in Ukrainian Second League and on 7 August 2021 he scored his first goal with the new club against Kremin. On 31 August he played in the Ukrainian Cup in the season 2021–22 against Obolon Kyiv for the third preliminary round.

Honours
Dnipro-1
 Ukrainian First League: 2018–19

References

External links 
 Profile at FC Polissya Zhytomyr
 
 
 

1995 births
Living people
Footballers from Chernihiv
Ukrainian footballers
Ukrainian Premier League players
Ukrainian First League players
FC Yunist Chernihiv players
FC Dinaz Vyshhorod players
FC Volyn Lutsk players
SC Dnipro-1 players
FC Ahrobiznes Volochysk players
FC Polissya Zhytomyr players
Association football defenders